The National Basketball League of Canada (NBLC) All-Star Game was an annual exhibition basketball played between the Central and Atlantic division All-stars. Ten players—five starters and five reserves—from each division are chosen from the league's rosters. The following is a list of NBL Canada All-Stars, players who have been selected by the coaches to compete in All-Star Weekend.  The All-star game was held three times between 2012 and 2014, although no player has played in all three All-Star Games. Ten players have competed at this stage on two occasions. Joey Haywood and Eddie Smith were the captains of the 2012 game, in which the All-Stars were divided into teams regardless of which division their team played in.

Source:

References 

All